Norbert Young is a Nigerian actor. He has appeared in series like Third Eye, Tinsel, and Family Circle.In addition to his work in television and films, Young has also appeared in several plays and stage productions.

Personal life 
Young is from Delta State, he is married to actress Gloria Young.

Filmography 
Checkmate
Alan Poza 
Heroes & Zeroes
Living Funeral
 ZR-7:The Red House Seven
 Quicksand

References

External links 
 Norbert Young at IMDb

Living people
1960 births
Actors from Delta State
21st-century Nigerian actors
Urhobo people
Nigerian male film actors
20th-century Nigerian actors
Nigerian television actors
20th-century births